This is a list of the successive governments of the Federal Republic of Germany from the time of the introduction of the Basic Law in 1949.

List

See also 
Government of Germany
Chancellor of Germany
Vice-Chancellor of Germany
Cabinet of Germany

References

Cabinets of Germany
Germany
Gov
Gov